Intertoys is a Dutch store-chain founded in 1976 that specialised in toys, multimedia and electronics. It is headquartered in Amsterdam.

History
In October 2017 Alteri Investors bought Intertoys from Blokker Holding.

In 2017, Intertoys had approximately 500 stores, of which around 450 were in the Netherlands. More than 100 of these were franchise stores and 15 XL megastores. Belgium had 11 stores and Germany 29.

In February 2019, Intertoys applied for an automatic stay. On 21 February it went bankrupt. The web store remained open at the request of the receivers. The franchise stores also remain open. Negotiations were on the way to sell the chain.

On March 8, 2019, it was announced that Green Swan, a Portuguese toy retailing specialist, had bought Intertoys with the intention to keep all stores open. At the beginning of September 2019, Intertoys was sold to Mirage Toys Group B.V. (formerly Blokker Holding). Today (March 2020) Intertoys has 123 own stores and 80 franchise branches in the Netherlands. Intertoys has approximately 1,100 employees. The head office of Intertoys is located in Amsterdam.

References

External links 

Companies based in Amsterdam
Retail companies established in 1976
Toy retailers
Retail companies of the Netherlands